The 2020–21 Tunisian Super Cup was the 17th edition of the Tunisian Super Cup. The match was contested by the 2020–21 Tunisian Ligue Professionnelle 1 champions, Espérance Sportive de Tunis and the Tunisian Cup winners, CS Sfaxien. The match took place at Stade Hammadi Agrebi in Tunis on 25 September 2021, ES Tunis won the game 1–0.

Venue 
Stade Hammadi Agrebi, formerly known as Stade 7 Novembre is a multi-purpose stadium in Radès, Tunis, Tunisia about 10 kilometers south-east of the city center of Tunis, in the center of the Olympic City. It is currently used mostly for football matches and it also has facilities for athletics. The stadium holds 65,000 and was built in 2001 for the 2001 Mediterranean Games and is considered to be one of the best stadiums in Africa.

Match

Summary
Nigerian forward Anayo Iwuala scored the only goal of the game for ES Tunis making it the clubs sixth Super Cup win. This also gives Radhi Jaïdi his first managerial trophy who only took charge of the team one month before in August 2021.

Details

Broadcasting

See also 

2020–21 Tunisian Ligue Professionnelle 1
2020–21 Tunisian Cup

Notes

References

External links 

Tunisian Super Cup
Supercup